Ledo is a village located in Giridih district in the Indian state of Jharkhand.

History
Ledo also historically known as Bhandar Leda was the part of Pargana Kharagdiha and the seat of the Zamindars of Ledo Gadi. The Zamindars of the estate belongs to Baghochia Clan and are a cadet branch of Hathwa Raj. The title used by the rulers of the estate is Rai.

References

Giridih district
Zamindari estates
01
Villages in Giridih district